is a former Japanese football player.

Playing career
Watanabe was born in Tokyo on May 12, 1977. After graduating from University of Tsukuba, he joined J1 League club Urawa Reds in 2001. On November 24, he debuted as substitute midfielder from the 88th minute against Nagoya Grampus Eight in last match in 2001 J1 League. On December 24, he played as substitute midfielder from the 89th minute against JEF United Ichihara in Emperor's Cup. However he could only play these match until 2002 and retired end of 2002 season.

Club statistics

References

External links

1977 births
Living people
University of Tsukuba alumni
Association football people from Tokyo
Japanese footballers
J1 League players
Urawa Red Diamonds players
Association football midfielders